Marcel Magniez (born 1888) was a French art director who designed the sets for around forty film productions from the late 1920s to the early 1950s.

Selected filmography
 Parisian Pleasures (1927)
 My Aunts and I (1937)
 The Chess Player (1938)
 Three from St Cyr (1939)
 Monsieur Hector (1940)
 Radio Surprises (1940)
 Bach en correctionnelle (1940)
 The Black Diamond (1941)
 Fantastic Night (1942)
 The Wolf of the Malveneurs (1943)
 The Misfortunes of Sophie (1946)
 The Faceless Enemy (1946)
 The Scarlet Bazaar (1947)
 The Wolf (1949)
 Fusillé à l'aube (1950)
 Cartouche, King of Paris (1950)
 The Fighting Drummer (1952)
 The Drunkard (1953)

References

Bibliography
 Crisp, Colin. French Cinema—A Critical Filmography: Volume 2, 1940–1958. Indiana University Press, 2015.
 Soister, John T. Conrad Veidt on Screen: A Comprehensive Illustrated Filmography. McFarland, 2002.

External links

1888 births
Year of death unknown
French art directors
Film people from Rouen